Eigen may refer to:

 Eigen (C++ library), computer programming library for matrix and linear algebra operations
 Eigen Technologies, the Document AI software company
 Eigen, Schwyz, settlement in the municipality of Alpthal in the canton of Schwyz, Switzerland
 Eigen, Thurgau, locality in the municipality of Lengwil in the canton of Thurgau, Switzerland
 Manfred Eigen (1927–2019), German biophysicist
 Saint Eigen, female Christian saint
, Japanese sport shooter

See also
 Eigenvalue, eigenvector and eigenspace in mathematics and physics
 Eigenclass, synonym to metaclass in the ruby programming language
 Eigenbehaviour, with its connection to eigenform and eigenvalue in cybernetics (relevant authors being Heinz von Foerster, Luis Rocha and Louis Kauffman)